Adamsdown Primary School is a school  in Adamsdown, Cardiff serving children from the ages of 3 to 11. Its motto is: Caring Sharing Learning Together.

In 2009, pupils from Adamsdown Primary School recorded a song, Adamsdown Song, with local songwriter Jon Blake. The track topped the Soundclick.com charts in May 2009.

In 2016 the school was assessed as needing improvements.

In 2018 the school doubled in size, with a new extension opened by Welsh Government Education Secretary, Kirsty Williams, in June 2018.

References

External links
 
 WalesOnline analysis

Primary schools in Cardiff